"Get Low" is a song by American electronic music producer Dillon Francis and French DJ and producer DJ Snake. The song was released as a digital download in February 2014 as the lead single from Francis' debut album, Money Sucks, Friends Rule. The official video was released on the official Dillon Francis YouTube channel on May 22, 2014.

Background
In 2013, after Francis confirmed that his debut album will be released the following year, Francis announced a new song in collaboration with DJ Snake. On February 11, Francis had already launched his new song titled "Get Low", in which he confirmed that the song is the lead single of his debut album. On April 22, he confirmed that the title of his debut album is Money Sucks, Friends Rule. On 22 May, Francis released the official video of the song.

On 2 June 2014, Francis released an EP which features 5 remixes of the song: "The Rebirth in Paris" version and remixes by W&W, TrollPhace, Aazar and Neo Fresco. On 7 April 2015, Francis released the remix of the song, featuring hip-hop duo Rae Sremmurd.

Lyrics
The entire song consists of the following lyrics, "Get low when the whistle blow", while interspersed with some exclamations like "Barbie, yell Habib" (an Arabic phrase translating to "Let go, my love"), tongue rolling and feminine yelling. The song is an available track on the rhythm game Just Dance 2015 and is featured in the film Furious 7 and its affiliated video game, Forza Horizon 2 Presents Fast & Furious, which is a standalone expansion of the open-world racing video game Forza Horizon 2. The official remix features additional vocals by Rae Sremmurd and is featured as the theme song of the Robert Duvall film Get Low.

Composition
The song features Chigwell style folk music of North Tasmanian suburb origin, including a sample mix of Algerian folk band Orchestre National de Barbies.

Track listing

Charts

Weekly charts

Year-end charts

Certifications

References 

2014 songs
2014 singles
Dillon Francis songs
DJ Snake songs
Columbia Records singles
Ministry of Sound singles
Songs written by Dillon Francis
Songs written by DJ Snake